Lumijoki is a municipality of Finland.

It is located in the Northern Ostrobothnia region. The municipality has a population of 
which 
is water. The population density is
.

Neighbouring municipalities are Hailuoto, Liminka, Oulu and Siikajoki.

The municipality is unilingually Finnish.

History 
Lumijoki literally means "snow river", most likely through Lumijärvi, the lake from which the river Lumijoki once began from. Toponyms with the word lumi usually refer to areas where the snow stays for longer than in nearby areas. The village was first mentioned in 1548, when it was a part of the Liminka parish. It gained chapel rights in 1640, eventually becoming an independent parish and municipality in 1867.

References

External links

Municipality of Lumijoki – Official website 

Populated coastal places in Finland
Municipalities of North Ostrobothnia
Populated places established in 1867